Q107 is the on-air brand name of several radio stations in Canada and the United States. Stations using this brand name typically broadcast within the 106.9 to 107.9 range on the FM radio, and have the letter Q in their call sign, often as the final letter.

Stations using this identifier include:
Canada
 CFGQ-FM, in Calgary, Alberta
 CILQ-FM, in Toronto, Ontario

United States
 KKEQ, in Fosston, Minnesota/Grand Forks, North Dakota
 KQRN, in Mitchell, South Dakota
 KTBQ, in Lufkin, Texas
 WCGQ, in Columbus, Georgia
 WJSE, in Wildwood, New Jersey
 WMQT, in Marquette, Michigan
 WQLT-FM, in Florence, Alabama
 WSAQ, in Port Huron, Michigan

Former stations using this identifier include:
 WKQB-FM (1977–1991), in Charleston, South Carolina, now WNKT, in Eastover, South Carolina
 WRRQ (2006–2013), in Binghamton, New York, now WCDW
 WRQX (1979–1990), in Washington, D.C., now WLVW
 WHBQ-FM (2010s-2020), in Memphis, Tennessee

Northern Ireland
 Seven FM